Mons Ardeshir is one of the mountains on the Moon, inside crater King. Its diameter is 8 km. In 1976 it was named after Persian king Ardeshir.

References

Links
 NASA topophotomap (1974)
 Lunar chart LAC-65
 Mons Ardeshir on The Moon Wiki

Ardeshir